Batîr is a village in Cimișlia District, near the southern border of Moldova.

References

Villages of Cimișlia District